The American Amateur Football Association Cup was an American soccer competition open to amateur teams affiliated with the American Amateur Football Association (AAFA).  It played only two years, 1912 and 1913 before being superseded by the National Challenge Cup, now known as the Lamar Hunt U.S. Open Cup.

History
In an October 1911 meeting, the New York State Football Association created the American Amateur Football Association (AAFA) and tasked it with standardizing rules and procedures for U.S. soccer. In 1912, the AAFA initiated a national cup open to all amateur U.S. teams.  Despite the national invitation, only twenty-seven teams from the New York area entered along with one from Maryland. The AAFA had headquarters at the Astor House in New York City. The officers of the association were Dr. G.R. Manning (president), William A. Campbell (vice-president), C.C. Pickford (treasurer), Thomas W. Cahill (secretary). Organizations affiliated with the AAFA included the New York and District Amateur League, Metropolitan and District Amateur League, Utah Association Foot Ball Union, Michigan State Soccer Foot Ball League, Pittsburgh Press Soccer League, Association Foot Ball League of St. Louis and The Tribune Soccer League.

Entries

 Anglo-Saxon F.C.Brooklyn (NYDL D2)
 Arcadia Thistle F.C.New York (NYDL D1)
 Boys Club F.C.New York (MDL D1)
 Bronx United F.C.New York (NAFL)
 Brooklyn F.C.Brooklyn (NAFL)
 Brooklyn Celtic F.C.Brooklyn (NYDL D1)
 Cameron F.C.New York (NYDL D1)
 Clan Gordon F.C.Portchester (NYDL D2)
 Clan McDonald F.C.Brooklyn (NYDL D1)

 Clan McDuffNew York (NYDL D1)
 Clan McKenzie F.C. (NYDL D1)
 Columbia OvalNew York (NYDL D1)
 Critchley F.C.Brooklyn (NYDL D1)
 Donegal Celtic F.C. (NYDL D2)
 Eureka F.C.New York (NYDL D2)
 German A.C.New York (NYDL D2)
 Greenpoint Rovers F.C.Brooklyn (NYDL D2)
 Hollywood Inn F.C.Yonkers (NYDL D1)

 Mount Vernon F.C. (NYDL D2)
 New York Celtic F.C.New York (NYDL D2)
 Newark F.C.Newark (NYDL D1)
 St. George ANew York (NYDL D2)
 St. George BNew York (MDL D1)
 Sheffield F.C.Newark (NYDL D2)
 Sons of St. GeorgeBaltimore 
 Washington F.C.Weehawken (NYDL D2)
 Yonkers F.C. (NYDL D1)

NYDL- New York and District Amateur Association Foot Ball LeagueMDL- Metropolitan and District Amateur Foot Ball LeagueNAFL- National Association Foot Ball League

First round
The Bronx United, Brooklyn FC, Clan McKenzie, German AC and Greenpoint teams drew byes. Boys Club, Donegal Celtic and Mount Vernon forfeited.

replays

Bracket

Final

See also
1913 American Amateur Football Association Cup

References

Defunct soccer competitions in the United States
Soccer cup competitions in the United States
1911–12 in American soccer